China–Tunisia relations are foreign relations between China and Tunisia. The People's Republic of China (PRC) established diplomatic relationship with Tunisia in 1964, 8 years after Tunisia got its independence.

Tunisia has adhered to the One-China policy where, like all the majority of countries, recognize the PRC as the sole legitimate government of "China" and Taiwan and all other islands controlled by the Republic of China (ROC) are recognized by Tunisia as part of PRC's territory as Tunisia does not recognize the ROC as legitimate.

Bilateral visits
Former Chinese President Jiang Zemin had visited Tunisia in April 2002 and had signed a series of economic, technical and financial support along with cultural cooperation agreements.

Chinese development finance to Tunisia
From 2000 to 2011, there are approximately 15 Chinese official development finance projects identified in Tunisia through various media reports. These projects range from $4.6 million worth of in-kind humanitarian assistance to Tunisia in 2011, to a technical and economic co-operation agreement in 2011, and an in-kind grant of RMB30 million to construct two dams in the Tataouine Governorate in South Tunisia.

See also
 Foreign relations of China
 Foreign relations of Tunisia

References

External links
 China.org
 Chinese Embassy in Tunisia

 
Tunisia
Bilateral relations of Tunisia
Tunisia